Organic solderability preservative or OSP is a method for coating of printed circuit boards. It uses a water-based organic compound that selectively bonds to copper and protects the copper until soldering.

The compounds typically used are from the azole family such as benzotriazoles, imidazoles, benzimidazoles. These adsorb on copper surfaces, by forming coordination bonds with copper atoms and form thicker films
through formation of copper (I) – N–heterocycle complexes. The typical film thickness used is in the tens to hundreds of nanometers.

See also 
 Electroless nickel immersion gold (ENIG)
 Hot air solder leveling (HASL)
 Immersion silver plating (IAg)
 Immersion tin plating (ISn)
 Reflow soldering
 Wave soldering

References 

 Tong, K. H., M. T. Ku, K. L. Hsu, Q. Tang, C. Y. Chan, and K. W. Yee. “The Evolution of Organic Solderability Preservative (OSP) Process in PCB Application.” 2013 8th International Microsystems, Packaging, Assembly and Circuits Technology Conference (IMPACT). Institute of Electrical & Electronics Engineers (IEEE), October 2013. doi:10.1109/impact.2013.6706620.

Printed circuit board manufacturing